The national emblem of the Democratic Republic of the Congo has changed several times since 1997. The current one was introduced in 2006 and depicts a leopard head, surrounded by an elephant tusk to the left and a spear to the right. Below are the three words which make up the national motto: Justice, Paix, Travail (Justice, Peace, Work in French). It was adopted on 18 February 2006 by President Joseph Kabila.

The arms are described in detail in Section 1, Article 1 of the 2005 constitution.

The old emblem, which was introduced in 2003, depicted three interlocked hands surrounded by two laurel branches. At the top is a lion head and at the bottom the motto Démocratie, Justice, Unité (Democracy, Justice, Unity in French).

The coat of arms of the Democratic Republic of the Congo from 1999 consists of a light blue shield. In the middle is a yellow star, above which there are six smaller stars. This coat of arms was introduced along with the flag.

An even older arms from 1971 to 1997, when the nation was known as Zaire, depicted a leopard head, below it a pair of crossed spears, around it a branch and an elephant tusk. The words Paix, Justice, Travail are written on a white band under the spears. This device was officially introduced on 1 August 1964.

Gallery

Unilaterally declared states

Subnational emblems 
Some of the Provinces of the Democratic Republic of the Congo have adopted their own distinctive emblems, others use the national emblem of the Democratic Republic of the Congo.

See also
Armorial of Africa
Flag of the Democratic Republic of the Congo

References

National symbols of the Democratic Republic of the Congo
Congo, Democratic Republic of the
Congo, Democratic Republic
Congo, Democratic Republic
Congo, Democratic Republic